Charles Joseph Étienne Wolf (9 November 1827 in Vorges – 4 July 1918) was a French astronomer.

In 1862, Urbain Le Verrier offered him a post as assistant at the Paris Observatory.

In 1867 he and Georges Rayet discovered Wolf–Rayet stars. 

He was elected to the positions of Vice-President (1897) and President (1898) of the French Academy of Sciences.

References

External links
 MNRAS 79 (1919) 235
  (p. 451)
 Obs 41 (1918) 365
 The Pulfrich Effect: Wolf (1865)

1827 births
1918 deaths
People from Aisne
19th-century French astronomers
École Normale Supérieure alumni
Members of the French Academy of Sciences
Members of the Ligue de la patrie française